Bharat Swamy led the first commercially successful rock band in India. He is one of the pioneers of rock music in India, and was the original composer, songwriter and vocalist for the band Agni. He is an engineer by profession, but always wanted to be one of the pioneers of rock music in India with his own compositions.

Agni the Band :
Formed in 1985 by Pravin Bell, Bharath and Juggie, Agni (spelled Agni) has stood the test of time to become one of the most loved rock bands in the country. It grew up struggling with sub-standard instruments and disinterested recording labels, but always with the goal of carving an identity of their own. In 1992 Agni came out of its childhood with Rustom (Ross) Kayani and Kaustubh (Koko) Dhavale joining the band. And it translated all its restless energy and hunger for succour (very much a hall mark of Agni, the Firegod) into a creative force that could not be denied. And from Pune[s best band they grew into one of the premier rock acts in India.

A record company, Virgo, took notice and their first album, Wind Dance With Fire, was released in 1993. In spite of poor production values on their first video, Darkening Light, their supporters were delighted with the air time on MTV and the album sold more than 60,000 copies all over the country. In fact, their appeal was such that 10,000 CDs were sold out within the first four days. The band toured all over the country, from the plushness of Delhi’s Holiday Inn and the grimness of Tihar Jail to the rocky heights of the North East. The number, Kashmir, is chanted by crowds till this day whenever and wherever they take the stage.

Agni Webbed
In 2020, Bharat Swamy launched Agni Webbed, a digital rock venture that is seen as a promising online platform. He released the original song The Monster Within in May 2020 and was awarded the highest ratings for the first half of 2020 by the music communication portal Music Plus. The song The Monster Within highlights the theme of depression, in order to reach out to all those who may be going through difficult and tough times with the COVID-19 pandemic throughout the world. The track has been mixed and mastered by Ashish Manchanda of Media Tribe.
Bharat Swamy has recently released a new platform that both tackles the taboo topic and helps struggling young musicians.

References 

Rock songwriters
Indian rock singers
Indian rock musicians
Indian composers
Indian male singer-songwriters
Indian singer-songwriters
Year of birth missing (living people)
Living people